The word "FITkit" may apply to several different topics:

In immunology:
FITkit, an immunological test for measuring natural rubber latex (NRL) allergens from a variety of rubber products, such as gloves

In computer science:
FITkit (hardware), educational hardware platform on Brno University of Technology